Ineke Yvonne Ran (born 20 April 1962, in Badhoevedorp) is a former freestyle and butterfly swimmer from the Netherlands, who competed for her native country at the 1976 Summer Olympics in Montreal, Quebec, Canada. She was eliminated in the preliminaries for 100m and 200m freestyle and 100m butterfly. She swam in the preliminaries for the Dutch relay team that ended up in fifth place in the 4 × 100 m medley. As part of the freestyle team she was 4th in the 4 × 100 m relay, together with Enith Brigitha, Linda Faber and Annelies Maas. She won two medals at the 1977 European Aquatics Championships, bronze in 100m butterfly and silver 4 × 100 m freestyle relay.

References

1962 births
Living people
Dutch female freestyle swimmers
Dutch female butterfly swimmers
Olympic swimmers of the Netherlands
Swimmers at the 1976 Summer Olympics
People from Haarlemmermeer
European Aquatics Championships medalists in swimming
Sportspeople from North Holland